Pieter Anthonisz. van Groenewegen (1590/1600–1658) was a Dutch Golden Age landscape painter.

Groenewegen, who was born in Delft, primarily painted landscapes. He traveled to Italy and between ca. 1615-1623 he lived on Via Bocca de Leone in Rome, where he became a member of the Bentvueghels with the nickname "Leeuw"(Lion). He returned to Delft where he became a member of the Guild of Saint Luke in 1626, but spent the last few years of his life in The Hague, where he joined the Confrerie Pictura in 1657. He died there in the following year.
Many of his works now reside at the Rijksmuseum Amsterdam.

References

 Pieter Anthonisz van Groenewegen on Artnet

External links
Vermeer and The Delft School, a full text exhibition catalog from The Metropolitan Museum of Art, which has material on Pieter Anthonisz. van Groenewegen

1590s births
1658 deaths
Dutch Golden Age painters
Dutch male painters
Artists from Delft
Members of the Bentvueghels
Painters from Delft
Painters from The Hague